The Ghaghara River, called Karnali River in Nepal and Mapcha Tsangpo in Tibet, is a perennial trans-boundary river that originates in the northern slopes of the Himalayas in the Tibetan Plateau, cuts through the Himalayas in Nepal and joins the Sharda River at Brahmaghat in India. Together they form the Ghaghara River, a major left bank tributary of the Ganges. With a length of  it is the longest river in Nepal. It is the largest tributary of the Ganges by volume and the second largest by length after Yamuna.

Course 

The river flows south through one of the most remote and least explored areas of Nepal as the Karnali River. The  Seti River drains the western part of the catchment and joins the Karnali River in Doti District north of Dundras hill.

Cutting southward across the Sivalik Hills, it splits into two branches, the Geruwa on the left and Kauriala river on the right near Chisapani to rejoin south of the Indian border and form the proper Ghaghara. Other tributaries originating in Nepal are the West Rapti, the Kali (or Mahakali) and the little Gandak. Sarayu river is stated to be synonymous with the modern Ghaghara river or as a tributary of it.

Karnali River exposes the oldest part of the Sivalik Hills of Nepal. The remnant magnetization of siltstones and sandstones in this group suggests a depositional age of between 16 million and 5.2 million years.

Basin

The Karnali River Basin lies between the mountain ranges of Dhaulagiri in Nepal and Nanda Devi in Uttarakhand. Dhaulagiri II, elevation , is the highest point of the entire basin. In the north, it lies in the rain shadow of the Himalayas. The population of the Basin districts in Nepal increased from 1.9 million in 1971 to 4.7 million people in 2001, almost a 250% increase over three decades. The average population density of the Basin area increased from 53 persons/km2 in 1981 to 87 persons/km2 in 2001. There is a steady growth in the economically active population in the basin districts. The average literacy rate has increased from a mere 7.5% in 1971 to 45% in 2001. The social status of the permanent households increased from 24% in 1991 to 31% in 2001.

Tributaries
Chhoti Gandak is a groundwater-fed meandering river originating near Dhesopool, Maharajganj district of Uttar Pradesh. The Chhoti Gandak River Basin is located between 26°00' to 27°20' N latitude and 83°30' to 84°15' E longitude. Right bank tributaries are Khekhra, Hirna, Jethan, Maun, Duhari, Kanchi and Koilar rivers; Khanua river joins from the left bank. The discharge of Chhoti Gandak is mainly controlled by rain, which is very high during the monsoon season and low during the summers. It has been observed that whenever precipitation is high in the catchment areas, there is flood in the downstream part of the Chhoti Gandak River Basin. The region exhibits upland terrace surface, river valley terrace surface, present-day river channel with narrow flood plains, natural levee, and point-bar deposits. All these geomorphic features are depositional in nature and made up of alluvium of different ages.

The main tributaries of the Karnali are Seti and Bheri.

Administrative zones and districts 
In Nepal, the Karnali Province is the largest zone with about  area. Its administrative center is Jumla. The zone is divided into the five districts of Dolpa, Humla, Jumla, Kalikot and Mugu.

The Karnali Province has the lowest population density in Nepal. There are no large settlements on the banks of the river, which is only crossed near Chisapani by the Mahendra Highway. This region is now connected by karnali highway and now due to various hydro electricity projects this area is being developed. Now a 900 MW project is going to be constructed in this river

In India, the administrative districts in the Ghaghra catchment are Ambedkar Nagar, Faizabad, Ayodhya, Azamgarh, Barabanki, Basti, Ballia, Bahraich, Deoria, Gonda, Gorakhpur, Sant Kabir Nagar, Lakhimpur Kheri, Mau, Sitapur of Uttar Pradesh and Siwan district in Bihar.

Important towns in India include Akabarpur, twin towns of Ayodhya and Faizabad, Bahraich, Barabanki, Basti, Deoria, Barhalganj, Gonda, Gorakhpur, Sitapur, Siddharthnagar, Saint Kabir Nagar, Kamhariya, Rajesultanpur and Tanda in Uttar Pradesh and Chapra, Siwan, and Sonepur in Bihar.

The Ghaghra River is locally known as "Sarayu" or "Saryu" in the city of Ayodhya.

Protected areas 

Bardia National Park is the largest and most undisturbed protected area in the Karnali River basin, covering  on the southern slopes of the Sivalik Hills. It is bordered in the south by the Babai River, and to the west by the Girwa River, a tributary of the Karnali. At Chisapani Gorge, the swift-flowing Karnali River emerges from the Shiwalik Range onto the broad plain and flows purposefully through the semi-tropical jungle. The park is famous for two Asian elephant herds, several deer species, gaur, nilgai, Himalayan tahr, serow and goral. The Karnali supports the endangered mugger crocodile, the gharial, a few remaining South Asian river dolphins and the golden mahseer.

Other protected areas include Katarniaghat Wildlife Sanctuary.

Endangered species 

The Karnali provides the upper range for the Gangetic river dolphin (Platanista gangetica), the largest freshwater mammals found on the Indian subcontinent. They are considered vulnerable species under CITES Appendix 1 and are classified as endangered on the IUCN Red List (IUCN, 2004). The river dolphins are legally protected animals in Nepal as endangered mammal and fall under Schedule I of the protected list of National Parks & Wildlife Conservation Act, 1973. Living at the upstream range limit, dolphins in the Karnali River are particularly vulnerable to threats from habitat degradation. Dolphins need deep pools of water. They are often found in places where human activities are most intense and they are sometimes accidentally caught by the local people who live in the lower Karnali basin. The Karnali River supports the last potentially viable population of the Ganges river dolphin in Nepal.

A high dam has been planned for some time just upstream of the dolphins' current (or at least recent) range in the Karnali River, Nepal. If built, this structure would almost certainly eliminate the small amount of dolphin habitat in Nepal's last river with a potentially viable dolphin population. Disturbance and environmental degradation associated with geotechnical feasibility studies and bridge and road construction for the dam already may have contributed to a decline in the number and range of dolphins or susu above the Nepal-India border. The Ghaghara is the furthest upstream in the dolphin range.

Development projects 
In Nepal

The Karnali basin is the first to arouse keen interest in Nepal's vast hydropower development study. There are several attractive sites for the generation of cheap hydroelectric energy in this basin.

The Master Plan Study for Water Resource Development of the Upper Karnali River and Mahakali River Basins (1993) identified 32 potential hydropower projects in the Karnali Basin. Despite the high potential of hydropower development (32,000 MW) in the Basin, only 2,245 kW capacities (from eight micro hydel schemes) has been developed so far.

Considering the pace of hydropower development in Nepal (Out of 83,000 MW potential, only 705 MW hydropower has been generated throughout the country until the end of the 12th national plan viz. 2009/10-2011-12) in general and in the Karnali Basin in particular, harnessing the total hydropower potential of the Basin is envisaged to take a long time. Based on recent water resources development planning and project progress, the likely large scale hydropower projects that will be operational in the Basin by 2025 are predicted to be: West Seti HEP (750 MW); Upper Karnali HEP (300 MW); Bheri-Babai Multipurpose Project (48 MW); and Lohore Khola HEP (58 MW).

West Seti HEP (750 MW)

The proposed West Seti HEP is located on the Seti River in the Far-Western Development Region of Nepal. The West Seti HEP catchment covers the upper  of the Seti River Basin. The West Seti HEP is a large storage project with a rated capacity of 750 MW. All project sites, excluding the reservoir area and transmission line corridor, are located in either Doti and/or Dadeldhura Districts. The reservoir area is located in Doti, Dadeldhura, Baitadi and Bajhang Districts. The transmission line corridor is located in Doti, Dadeldhura, Kailali and Kanchanpur Districts. The project has been allocated for development as BOOT project under private sector.

Upper Karnali HEP (900 MW)

This project is one of Nepal's most economically attractive runoff- river diversion schemes (900 MW), with daily peaking capacity and high firm energy. Project facilities will be located in three districts: Surkhet, Dailekh and Achham. Project hydrology is based on data from station 240 at Asaraghat. The project has been allocated to GMR of India for development on BOOT basis.

Bheri-Babai Multipurpose Project (48 MW)

The Bheri-Babai Multipurpose Project is an inter-Basin water transfer project prioritised for the development of irrigation in Bardia District . The Bheri-Babai project aims to generate electricity and supply additional water to the Babai Irrigation Scheme in the Terai by diverting  of water from the Bheri River into the Babai River. The project is yet to undergo a feasibility study.

Lohore Khola HEP (LR-1) – (58 MW)

The Lohore Khola HEP is a proposed reservoir storage project situated on the Lohore Khola, a tributary of the Karnali River in Dailekh District. The project is located a few kilometers downstream from the confluence with Chham River and upstream of Dungeshowr. Based on the isohyetal map of the Karnali River Basin, average annual rainfall for the basin is estimated to be . The sediment flow into the river is estimated to be 2.4 million tonnes per year. As the economic internal rate of return (EIRR) for the project is highest for the draft rate of 0.7, the flow for power generation was estimated for this draft rate. The riparian flow was assumed to be 10 percent of the monthly minimum flow; i.e., .

Karnali (Chisapani) Multipurpose Project (10,800 MW)

The site of the Karnali Multipurpose Project, also Chisapani Dam Project, is located in the Karnali Gorge, immediately upstream of the Terai.
Project planning commenced in 1960, although the feasibility study for the project was only completed in 1989. Before this project is developed a number of significant underlying issues have to be resolved. These issues include: Nepal and India reaching a bilateral agreement on the downstream benefits of regulated river flows; the resettlement of over 60,000 people; the impact on and restoration of habitat within Bardia National Park; and, above all, the financial arrangements for project funding. Accordingly, it is predicted that the chances of this project being implemented before 2025 are very slim, although increasing international pressure on reducing greenhouse gas (GHG) emissions from the energy generation sector may assist project initiation. While the likelihood of this project being developed by 2025 is low, Nepal and India could cooperate to develop this project to meet India's growing energy demand from renewable resources.

Irrigation

Nepal
The major existing river use by volume in the Karnali Basin is irrigation. Three areas on the Nepal Terai and two areas in India are irrigated from the Karnali River. Within Nepal, two areas are irrigated in Bardiya District, and a single site is irrigated in Kailali District, . This is equivalent to 3.9 percent of the  mean annual Karnali River flow into India.

India

On account of high silt flows during the flood season, Sarda Sahayak supplies (from Karnali) are suspended for 100 days between June and October, when the Lower Sarda Canal (feeder canal) draws water from the Sarda River, which is then flooded.

Navigation 
In the past the Karnali River was considered to be attractive for the development of navigation right from the Indo–Nepal border to the confluence of this river and the Ganges. The lower reach of this river—called the Ghaghra in India—was used in the past for navigation by steamers. Apart from in the foothills of the Himalayas where most of the streams were simply fast-moving water throughout the greater part of the year and not navigable when flowing rapidly, most of the rivers with steadier currents had boats on them. The Ganges, the Ghaghra, the Yamuna, the Gomti, the Sharda and the Rapti were the most important navigable rivers in the Northwestern provinces and Oudh.

Many trade items such as timber, food grains, sugar, indigo, cotton seed, poppy seed and mustard seed were transported by boats. April, May and June were the most suitable months and were a busy trading period.

In the latter half of the 19th century when the railways came into existence, the significance of waterways as inland trade routes declined, as the railways were faster and safer. With the exception of eastern parts of Bengal where abundance of water in the natural network of channels sustained and continued to provide a suitable mode of transport of goods and people, the railways had almost entirely replaced the waterways as communication lines throughout the country by the end of the 19th century.

The possibilities for further extension of the steamer services to the north had also been explored in the past. This survey was done in the years 1943–53 to explore the possibility of improvement and extension of navigation on this river by powered crafts. These depths were available without any river conservancy works. All other conditions of navigable channel such as the width and current of flow etc. were also found to be very favourable. The low water stage in this river is only for a short duration. There is a great urgency to carry out detailed study of the Karnali river to develop modern inland waterway by applying various channel improvement technologies.

See also
 List of rivers of Nepal
 List of rivers of India
 Battle of Ghaghra

References

External links

 Ghaghara River marked on OpenStreetMap
 Nepal River Conservation Trust: The Karnali River
 A very short description of Ghaghra River
 Karnali Bridge in Far-Western Nepal

Rivers of Karnali Province
International rivers of Asia
Tributaries of the Ganges
Rivers of Uttar Pradesh
Rivers of Tibet
Rivers in Buddhism
Rivers of India
Ghaghara
Braided rivers in India